Zamia wallisii is a species of plant in the Coontie Family (Zamiaceae). It is endemic to Colombia. Its common name is chigua.

History
Zamia wallisii was described in 1875 by Alexander Braun from material collected by Gustav Wallis in Colombia. The species was collected once again in 1888 by Guillermo Kalbreyer and then not seen again for 100 years. Both the Wallis and Kalbreyer collections were lost and no type specimen was extant resulting in some doubt about the existence of the species until its rediscovery in the 1980s, by Ian Sutherland Turner. Its most noteworthy feature is its leaflets, which are up to 23.5 inches (60 centimeters) long and eleven inches (26.5 centimeters) wide, the largest of any gymnosperm.

Conservation
There is only one known population of this plant, comprising fewer than 50 individuals. It is located in habitat that is being consumed by deforestation. Plants are found near the town of Frontino, Antioquia Department, and also near Urrao, and in Las Orquideas National Park.

References

wallisii
Endemic flora of Colombia
Veitch Nurseries
Critically endangered plants
Taxonomy articles created by Polbot